Srul Irving Glick  (September 8, 1934 – April 17, 2002) was a Canadian composer, radio producer, conductor, and teacher.

Born in Toronto, Ontario, he received a Bachelor of Music from the University of Toronto 1955, and a Masters of Music (Toronto), honorary FRCCO (1993). He continued his studies in Paris, France, with such masters as Darius Milhaud, Louis Saguer and Max Deutsch. He was a teacher of theory and composition himself at the Royal Conservatory of Music and York University.

Glick was one of Canada's most prolific composers, having written in all media from chamber music to oratorio. He won numerous awards including the extraordinary Yuvel Award in 2000, presented by The Cantor's Assembly of America, for his "lifelong commitment to the composition of music that captures the heart and touches the soul"; the prestigious Ateret Kavod (Crown of Honour) Award in 2001 from the United Synagogue of America. He also received the J.I. Segal Award for his contribution to Jewish music in Canada; the Kavod Award presented by the Cantor's Assembly of America, "for his lifelong dedication to the music of the synagogue, to cantorial chant and to cantors"; The Solomon Schechter Award presented to the Beth Tikvah's music program by the United Synagogue of America; an Honorary Fellowship from the Royal Canadian College of Organists "for his contribution to musical life in Canada, and in particular to the music of the synagogue", and in 1995, a second gold Solomon Schechter award for the best musical program for a synagogue in North America.

In 1986, Glick left the CBC where he had been a producer of serious music since 1962. His involvement in the field of production, recordings and programming won him seven Grand Prix du Disque and a Juno Award. In 1993, Mr. Glick received a Governor General's medal in honour of Canada's 125th anniversary of Confederation "for his contribution to Canadian culture", and in 1994 was appointed a Member of the Order of Canada for his "outstanding achievement, service to Canada and to humanity at large".

One of Canada's most prominent composers, Glick's music continues to be performed regularly at home, in the USA and abroad. His unique integration of contemporary music, Hebraic lyricism and classical composition techniques, formed into a masterful character-filled music that is both dramatic and lyrical, has won him considerable acclaim. A great many of his works appear on recordings and compact discs, and are published in Canada, the USA and the United Kingdom.

He died in Toronto in 2002.

See also 

 Music of Canada
 List of Canadian composers
 I never saw another butterfly (song cycle to children's poems from the concentration camp at Terezin 1942-1944)

External links
More information is available at
http://www.srulirvingglick.com
Encyclopedia of Music in Canada
The Canadian Music Centre also offers recordings for sale and sheet music for loans and purchase
http://www.musiccentre.ca.
 Srul Irving Glick at The Canadian Encyclopedia
 Srul Irving Glick: Canadian composer happy to be named 'He who wrestled with God' (Independent obituary)

1934 births
2002 deaths
Canadian classical composers
Jewish classical composers
Members of the Order of Canada
University of Toronto alumni
Academic staff of The Royal Conservatory of Music
Jewish Canadian musicians
Musicians from Toronto
Academic staff of York University
Canadian male classical composers
20th-century Canadian composers
Synagogue organists
20th-century organists
20th-century Canadian male musicians